Pitasakwala Kumarayai Pancho Hathai (Alien Prince and Seven Kids) is a 2008 Sri Lankan Sinhala science fiction film directed by Sirimal Wijesinghe and produced by Dushyantha Mahabaduge for Cinemaya International. It stars Sanath Gunathilake and Dilhani Ekanayake in lead roles along with Janaka Kumbukage and Suminda Sirisena. Music composed by Aruna Lian. It is the 1109th Sri Lankan film in the Sinhala cinema.

Cast
 Sanath Gunathilake
 Dilhani Ekanayake
 Janaka Kumbukage as Alien
 Nilanthi Wijesinghe
 Suminda Sirisena
 Ishan Samsudeen
 Kapila Sigera
 Devnaka Porage

References

2008 films
2000s Sinhala-language films
2008 comedy films
Sri Lankan comedy films